Estela de la Torre Borja (born 14 February 1965) is a Mexican gymnast. She competed in five events at the 1980 Summer Olympics.

References

External links
 

1965 births
Living people
Mexican female artistic gymnasts
Olympic gymnasts of Mexico
Gymnasts at the 1980 Summer Olympics
Place of birth missing (living people)
Pan American Games medalists in gymnastics
Pan American Games bronze medalists for Mexico
Gymnasts at the 1979 Pan American Games
Medalists at the 1979 Pan American Games
20th-century Mexican women
21st-century Mexican women